Araby may refer to:
 Araby, an archaic name for Arabia or the Arab world
 Araby (Mason's Springs, Maryland), a historic home listed on the NRHP
 "Araby" (short story), from James Joyce's 1914 Dubliners
 Araby (1999 film), an independent short film adapted from the short story
 Araby (Warhammer), a country in the Warhammer Fantasy setting by Games Workshop
 Arabi, Louisiana, United States
 Arabic chat alphabet, a method of transcribing Arabic into Latin alphabet plus Hindu-Arabic number
 Nabil Elaraby (born 1935), Foreign Minister of Egypt appointed on 6 March 2011
 "The Sheik of Araby", a 1921 jazz song
 "Araby", song by The Gun Club from their 1987 album Mother Juno
 Araby, fictional ship in the Tod Moran mysteries, novels by Howard Pease
 Araby (2017 film), a 2017 drama film

See also
 Arby (disambiguation)
 Al-Arabi (disambiguation)
 Arabi (disambiguation)
 Arabic (disambiguation)